Club Baloncesto Ciudad de Burgos was a women's professional Basketball team based in Burgos, Spain.

History
CB Ciudad de Burgos was founded in 1996 as a merger of the two top teams of the city:
CB Burgos
CB Alfa

In 2000 finished as runner-up of the Copa de la Reina, and played the Ronchetti Cup the next season.

In the 2005–06 season finished in the third position and lost in the Liga Femenina semifinals against Perfumerías Avenida, but in the next year the team was relegated to Liga Femenina 2.

Three years later, in 2011, the club came back to Liga Femenina. In July 2014, the club announced it would not compete in any senior competitions and in 2015 it merged with other local club.

Season by season

Notable players
 Tanya Bröring
 Anna Cruz
 Ziomara Morrison
 Jenny Whittle

References

External links
 Official website

Women's basketball teams in Spain
Basketball teams established in 1996
Basketball teams in Castile and León
Basketball teams disestablished in 2015
Sport in Burgos